The 2004 Major League Baseball postseason was the playoff tournament of Major League Baseball for the 2004 season. The winners of the League Division Series would move on to the League Championship Series to determine the pennant winners that face each other in the World Series.

In the American League, the New York Yankees made their tenth straight postseason appearance, the Minnesota Twins returned for the third straight year, the Anaheim Angels returned for the second time in three years, and the Boston Red Sox returned for the second straight year.

In the National League, the St. Louis Cardinals returned for the fourth time in five years, the Atlanta Braves made their thirteenth straight appearance, the Houston Astros returned for the second time in four years, and the Los Angeles Dodgers made their first appearance of the new Millennium.

The postseason began on October 5, 2004, and ended on October 27, 2004, with the Red Sox sweeping the Cardinals in the 2004 World Series. It was the Red Sox's first title since 1918, ending the Curse of the Bambino.

Playoff seeds
The following teams qualified for the postseason:

American League
 New York Yankees - 101–61, Clinched AL East
 Anaheim Angels - 96–66, Clinched AL West
 Minnesota Twins - 92–70, Clinched AL Central
 Boston Red Sox - 98–64, Clinched Wild Card

National League
 St. Louis Cardinals - 105–57, Clinched NL Central
 Atlanta Braves - 96–66, Clinched NL East
 Los Angeles Dodgers - 93–69, Clinched NL West
 Houston Astros - 92–70, Clinched Wild Card

Playoff bracket
2004 was the last postseason until 2020 where both LCS went to 7 games.

Bracket

Note: Two teams in the same division could not meet in the division series.

American League Division Series

(1) New York Yankees vs. (3) Minnesota Twins 

In a rematch of the previous year's series, the Yankees once again defeated the Twins to return to the ALCS for the seventh time in the past nine years. The Twins stole Game 1 at Yankee Stadium, however the Yankees would come back to win the next three games (two in extra innings) to advance to the next round.

As of 2022, this is the last time the Twins won a game in the postseason.

(2) Anaheim Angels vs. (4) Boston Red Sox 

This was the second postseason meeting between the Angels and Red Sox, the last time was in the 1986 ALCS, which the Red Sox won in seven games after being down 3-1 in the series. The Red Sox again defeated the Angels, this time in a sweep, to return to the ALCS for the second year in a row.

This series was not close - the Red Sox blew out the Angels in Games 1 and 2 in Anaheim to take a 2-0 series lead going back to Fenway Park. Game 3 was the only close contest of the series, which was won by the Red Sox 8-6 after 10 innings of play.

The Angels returned to the postseason again the next year, where they defeated the New York Yankees in the ALDS before falling to the eventual World Series champion Chicago White Sox in the ALCS.

National League Division Series

(1) St. Louis Cardinals vs. (3) Los Angeles Dodgers 

This was the second postseason meeting between the Dodgers and Cardinals. They previously met in the 1985 NLCS, which the Cardinals won in six games. The Cardinals defeated the Dodgers in four games to return to the NLCS for the third time in five years.

The Cardinals blew out the Dodgers in Games 1 and 2 by identical 8-3 scores to go up 2-0 in the series headed to Los Angeles. The Dodgers would shut out the Cardinals in Game 3 to avoid a sweep, however the Cardinals closed out the series with a 6-2 win in Game 4.

(2) Atlanta Braves vs. (4) Houston Astros 

In the fourth postseason meeting between these two teams, the Astros finally defeated the Braves in a tight five game series to return to the NLCS for the first time since 1986. Games 1 and 2 were split by both teams in Atlanta. In Houston, the Astros took Game 3 to go up 2-1 in the series, while the Braves narrowly prevailed in Game 4 to send the series back to Atlanta for a winner-take-all Game 5. However, it was all for naught as the Astros blew out the Braves to return to the NLCS for the first time in nearly two decades.

Both teams would meet again in the NLDS the next year, with the Astros prevailing again in four games.

American League Championship Series

(1) New York Yankees vs. (4) Boston Red Sox 

This was the third postseason meeting of the Yankees-Red Sox rivalry. The Yankees went up 3-0 in the series, capped off by a 19-8 bludgeoning at Fenway Park in Game 3. After the game, Bob Ryan of The Boston Globe wrote, "They are down, 3–0, after last night's 19–8 rout, and, in this sport, that is an official death sentence. Soon it will be over, and we will spend another dreary winter lamenting this and lamenting that." However, the Red Sox narrowly won Games 4 and 5, both in extra innings, to force the series back to Yankee Stadium. The Red Sox won Game 6 by a 4-2 score to force a Game 7, becoming the first team in MLB history to force a Game 7 after being down 3-0 in the series. The Red Sox blew out the Yankees in Game 7, becoming the third team in North American sports history to overcome a 3-0 series deficit and the first (and still only) team in the MLB to accomplish such a feat. The Red Sox returned to the World Series for the first time since 1986.

This was the first ALCS loss for the Yankees since 1980. The 2004 ALCS marked a turning point for both the Yankees and Red Sox. The Yankees entered a slump after the series loss, making only one more World Series appearance in 2009, which they won, however it would be their last as the team would fail to win the pennant during the next decade, and would lose to the Red Sox two more times in the postseason, in 2018 and 2021. The opposite was true for the Red Sox, as the team trended upwards, winning the World Series, and winning three more championships, in 2007, 2013, and 2018.

The Red Sox would win their next AL pennant in 2007, where they defeated the Cleveland Indians in seven games after trailing three games to one in the series.

National League Championship Series

(1) St. Louis Cardinals vs. (4) Houston Astros 

This was the first postseason meeting between the Cardinals and Astros. In a series where neither team won an away game, the Cardinals defeated the Astros in seven games to return to the World Series for the first time since 1987. 

The Cardinals took Game 1 in a high-scoring affair, 10-7, and won Game 2 by a 6-4 score thanks to back-to-back solo home runs from Albert Pujols and Scott Rolen. The Astros won convincingly in Game 3 by a 5-2 score to avoid a sweep thanks to a stellar pitching performance from Roger Clemens, and then took Game 4 by one run thanks to a solo home run by Carlos Beltrán in the bottom of the seventh inning to tie the series at two. The Astros then won Game 5 in a 3-0 shutout thanks to a walk-off three-run home run from Jeff Kent, and were now one win away from their first World Series appearance in franchise history. However, back in St. Louis, the Cardinals won Game 6 after a 12-inning duel thanks to a walk-off two-run home run from Jim Edmonds to force a seventh game. Then in Game 7, the Cardinals overcame a late Astros lead to win 5-2 and secure the pennant.

Both teams would meet again in the NLCS the next year, which the Astros won in six games. The Cardinals would win their next NL pennant in 2006, against the New York Mets in seven games.

2004 World Series

(AL4) Boston Red Sox vs. (NL1) St. Louis Cardinals 

This was the third World Series meeting between the Cardinals and Red Sox. They had previously met in 1946 and 1967, which were both won by the Cardinals. However, history would not repeat itself, as the Red Sox upset the 105-win Cardinals in a sweep to win their first title since 1918, ending the Curse of the Bambino. This was the third consecutive World Series won by a Wild Card team.

The Red Sox took Game 1 in a high-scoring affair, 11-9, and then won Game 2 by a 6-2 score as Curt Schilling became the first pitcher to win a World Series game with a team from both the American and National leagues. When the series shifted to St. Louis, the Red Sox controlled the tempo of both games. They won Game 3 by a 4-1 score after shutting out the Cardinals until the bottom of the ninth inning, and in Game 4 the Red Sox shut out the Cardinals to secure the title. Game 4 was the last World Series game ever played at Busch Memorial Stadium.

Along with the New England Patriots winning Super Bowl XXXVIII, the Boston metropolitan area had both World Series and Super Bowl champions in the same season or calendar year. The Cardinals and Red Sox would meet in the World Series again, in 2013, which the Red Sox won in six games. The Red Sox also made and won two more World Series - in 2007, and 2018 against the Colorado Rockies and the Los Angeles Dodgers respectively. The Cardinals would return to the World Series in 2006, in which they defeated the Detroit Tigers in five games.

References

External links
 League Baseball Standings & Expanded Standings - 2004

 
Major League Baseball postseason